Ghost is a live album first released by British musician Gary Numan in 1988. It was recorded live at the Hammersmith Odeon in London on 25 and 26 September 1987 during Numan's Exhibition Tour (an 18-month concert tour that promoted the compilation album Exhibition). The original release was only available as a fan club mail order double LP. It went on general release in the United Kingdom as a double CD in May 1992 before being released in the United States in 1999.

Ghost features live versions of several songs from Numan's Strange Charm (1986), an album that had not been promoted with a live concert tour.

Some Numa CD copies suffer from CD bronzing, though other copies (the discs are printed 'Mastered by Mayking') do not.

References

1988 live albums
Gary Numan live albums